My First Love  is a 1988 comedy-romance television film starring Richard Kiley and Bea Arthur.

Plot
The story revolves around an older widowed woman reconnecting with her high school sweetheart after not seeing him for thirty-five years.

Reception
The Los Angeles Times said "this is Arthur’s show all the way and she makes the time worthwhile, even when the second half of the script doesn’t measure up to the first. Shy and awkward, feminine and determined, she has never been more appealing."

References

External links
 

1988 television films
1988 films
1988 romantic comedy films
American romantic comedy films
American television films
Films directed by Gilbert Cates
1980s English-language films
1980s American films